Rugby is a city in, and the county seat of, Pierce County, North Dakota, United States. The population was 2,509 at the 2020 census, making it the 19th largest city in North Dakota. Rugby was founded in 1886.

Rugby is often billed as the geographic center of North America.

History
Rugby was founded in 1886 at a junction on the Great Northern Railway, where a branch line to Bottineau met the main line. The railroad promoters initially platted the town as Rugby Junction, getting the name Rugby from the town of Rugby in Warwickshire, England. It was one of several sites along the Great Northern's transcontinental route between Devils Lake and Minot that were named after places in England (the others were Berwick, Leeds, Knox, 
Norwich, Penn, Surrey, Churches Ferry, Tunbridge, and York). When the community became a city, the Junction was dropped from the name.

North Dakota's first permanent settlers arrived in 1812 from the Earl of Selkirk's colony in neighboring Rupert's Land. As farmers, they were more advanced than many of their contemporaries in the rest of the United States, having adopted sophisticated farming methods and machinery. Many of these implements, including an early McCormick Deering threshing machine, have found their way to the restored Pioneer Village in Rugby.

In 1931, the town of Rugby erected a  rock obelisk marking the "Geographical Center of North America". This was moved to a slightly different location in 1971 with the expansion of US Highway 2.

Geography

Rugby is located in eastern Pierce County at the intersection of U.S. Route 2 and North Dakota Highway 3. The Great Northern Railroad line passes through the community. Minot lies 66 miles to the west along Route 2.

Rugby claims to be the geographic center of North America and a monument stands in the city to signify this. The monument features flags of the United States, Canada, and Mexico. However, modern calculations that take on account the distortions caused by cartographic projections show that center is 145 miles southwest of Rugby, in a town called Center, North Dakota.

Transportation

Rail
Amtrak, the national passenger rail system, serves a station in Rugby via its Empire Builder, a once-daily train in each direction between Portland/Seattle and Chicago. The rail station was originally built by the Great Northern Railway in 1907 and has since undergone multiple renovations.

Highways
U.S. Route 2 and North Dakota Highway 3 serve the Rugby area.

Demographics

2010 census
As of the 2010 census, there were 2,876 people, 1,239 households, and 697 families living in the city. The racial makeup of the city was 91.9% White, 0.3% African American, 5.8% Native American, 0.9% from other races, and 1.1% from two or more races. Hispanic or Latino of any race were 1.3% of the population.

There were 1,239 households, of which 23.2% had children under the age of 18 living with them, 46.2% were married couples living together, 6.9% had a female householder with no husband present, 3.2% had a male householder with no wife present, and 43.7% were non-families. 39.7% of all households were made up of individuals, and 20.2% had someone living alone who was 65 years of age or older. The average household size was 2.11 and the average family size was 2.83.

The median age in the city was 47 years. 20% of residents were under the age of 18; 6.1% were between the ages of 18 and 24; 21.1% were from 25 to 44; 26.2% were from 45 to 64; and 26.6% were 65 years of age or older. The gender makeup of the city was 48.7% male and 51.3% female.

2000 census
As of the 2000 census, there were 2,939 people, 1,291 households, and 765 families living in the city. The racial makeup of the city was 98.09% White, 1.02% Native American, 0.37% Asian, 0.03% from other races, and 0.48% from two or more races. Hispanic or Latino of any race were 0.44% of the population.

The top six ancestry groups in the city are German (49.6%), Norwegian (40.5%), Irish (5.3%), English (4.0%), Russian (3.7%), French (3.6%).

There were 1,291 households, out of which 26.6% had children under the age of 18 living with them, 49.0% were married couples living together, 8.0% had a female householder with no husband present, and 40.7% were non-families. 37.3% of all households were made up of individuals, and 21.2% had someone living alone who was 65 years of age or older. The average household size was 2.17 and the average family size was 2.89.

In the city, the population was spread out, with 23.1% under the age of 18, 5.4% from 18 to 24, 23.1% from 25 to 44, 20.2% from 45 to 64, and 28.1% who were 65 years of age or older. The median age was 44 years. For every 100 females, there were 86.8 males. For every 100 females age 18 and over, there were 81.3 males.

The median income for a household in the city was $25,482, and the median income for a family was $35,745. Males had a median income of $25,885 versus $18,510 for females. The per capita income for the city was $14,380. About 9.6% of families and 13.7% of the population were below the poverty line, including 11.6% of those under age 18 and 19.1% of those age 65 or over.

Notable people

 Todd "Boogie" Brandt, radio personality with The Todd and Tyler Radio Empire
 Harald Bredesen (1918–2006), Lutheran pastor
 Nichi Farnham, Maine state senator
 Don Gaetz, Florida politician
 Jerry Gaetz (1914–1964), North Dakota state senator and mayor of Rugby
 Samuel Kirk (1904–1996), psychologist and educator
 Jon Nelson, member of the North Dakota House of Representatives
 Clifford Thompson (1904–1955), one of the world's tallest men
 Chris Tuchscherer, mixed martial artist
 Larry Watson, poet, writer, and educator

Radio
 KZZJ AM 1450
 KKWZ FM 95.3

Education
The city of Rugby is served by Rugby Public Schools: Ely Elementary School and Rugby High School. Little Flower Catholic School is also in Rugby.

Sites of interest

 Geographical center of North America – Rugby is located in the geographical center of North America. There is a cairn marking this spot.  Note:  The validity of this claim is disputed by a mathematical analysis.
 Prairie Village Museum houses some of Pierce County's oldest historical buildings and artifacts including the 1886 Great Northern Railroad Depot.
 The Victorian Dress Museum – The building that houses the museum is listed in the National Register of Historic Places.
 Pierce County Courthouse - dating from 1908, listed on the National Register of Historic Places.

Climate
This climatic region is typified by large seasonal temperature differences, with warm to hot (and often humid) summers and cold (sometimes severely cold) winters.  According to the Köppen Climate Classification system, Rugby has a humid continental climate, abbreviated "Dfb" on climate maps.

In popular culture
Rugby is mentioned in the Law & Order episode (S13E08) 'Asterisk' as the hometown of a fictional MLB baseball player indicted for murder and in the Law & Order episode (S16E18) 'Thinking Makes it So' during an argument.

References

External links

 City of Rugby official website
 Cairn marking Center of North America
 The Pierce County Tribune
 Rugby, ND Article at Dakota Search

Cities in Pierce County, North Dakota
Cities in North Dakota
County seats in North Dakota
Populated places established in 1886
1886 establishments in Dakota Territory
Geographical centres